The Zimbabwe cricket team toured Bangladesh from 26 October to 1 December 2014. The tour consisted of three Test matches and five One Day International matches. Bangladesh won the Test series 3–0 and the ODI series 5–0.

Squads

Tour matches

3-Day Warm Up: Bangladesh Cricket Board XI vs Zimbabweans

Practice Match: Bangladesh Cricket Board XI vs Zimbabweans

Test series

1st Test

2nd Test

3rd Test

ODI series

1st ODI

2nd ODI

3rd ODI

4th ODI

5th ODI

References

External links
 Series home at ESPN Cricinfo

2014 in Bangladeshi cricket
2014 in Zimbabwean cricket
International cricket competitions in 2014–15
Bangladeshi cricket seasons from 2000–01
Zimbabwean cricket tours of Bangladesh